Björn Stringheim is a Swedish former football player who played as a goalkeeper.

References 

Footballers from Malmö
Association football goalkeepers
Swedish footballers
Allsvenskan players
Malmö FF players
Veikkausliiga players
Vaasan Palloseura players
Swedish expatriate footballers
Expatriate footballers in Finland
Swedish expatriate sportspeople in Finland
1975 births
Living people